

Nkx2-2as  (Nkx2-2 antisense) is a long non-coding RNA. It is located in the cytoplasm of the cell. Nkx2-2as is involved in Neural development. Overexpression of Nkx2-2as results in increased levels of expression of the homeobox gene Nkx2-2 and enhances induction of the differentiation of oligodendrocytes. Besides Nkx2-2, Nkx2-2as may also regulate the expression of other genes.

See also 
 Long non-coding RNA

References

Further reading

External links 
 MGI entry for Nkx2-2as

Non-coding RNA